ITE College East (ITECE) is a post-secondary education institution and statutory board under the purview of the Ministry of Education in Singapore.

It is one of the Institute of Technical Education's three colleges under the "One ITE System, Three Colleges" Governance and Education Model.

Schools and courses 
The college has four schools which currently provides 43 full-time courses, 75 part-time courses, 3 traineeships and 9 work-study diplomas.

Campus 
The campus covers 10.7 hectares and was built in 2005 and officially opened on 24 March 2006. The building's walls are decorated with rectangular metal panels to match the surrounding Singapore Expo and Changi General Hospital. The architectural concept of the campus is a circular-shaped stool-like forum followed by three six-story curved buildings surrounding the central forum. There are several campus facilities likewise three cafeterias, 1000 seater auditorium, 36 IT training rooms, 60 lecture rooms, multimedia learning centre, retail outlets and indoor sports hall.

See also 
 Institute of Technical Education
 ITE College Central
 ITE College West

External links

References 

Institutes of Technical Education in Singapore
Educational institutions established in 2005
Education in Singapore
Tampines
Simei
2005 establishments in Singapore